James Drought (1738 – 1820) was an Irish academic.

Drought was born in County Offaly (then called King's County) and educated at Trinity College Dublin. He became a Fellow of Trinity College in 1762, a lecturer in 1778 and Regius Professor of Divinity there in 1790.

References
	

19th-century Irish people
Alumni of Trinity College Dublin
Academics of Trinity College Dublin
1738 births
1820 deaths
Regius Professors of Divinity (University of Dublin)
People from County Offaly